The TVyNovelas Award for Best Cast category is in the annual Premios TVyNovelas awards program for Mexican telenovelas (soap operas).

While the TVyNovelas Awards were established and begun in 1983, the Best Cast award was first given in 2015.

Winners and nominees

2010s

2020s

See also

References

External links 
TVyNovelas at esmas.com
TVyNovelas Awards at the univision.com

Cast
Cast
Cast